Ali Hüsrev Bozer (28 July 1925 – 30 September 2020) was a Turkish politician and academic of commercial law.

Biography
Bozer was born in Ankara, Turkey. At first a member of the Nationalist Democracy Party (MDP), then of the Motherland Party (ANAP), he served as deputy prime minister in the Turgut Özal's and Yıldırım Akbulut's cabinets and was minister of foreign affairs. He was one of the founders of Oyak-Renault, automotive company in Turkey (1969) and was chairman of the board of Oyak-Renault from 1991 to 1995. 

Bozer was the father of Coca-Cola Eurasia Group President Ahmet Bozer. He died on 30 September 2020, after contracting COVID-19 during the COVID-19 pandemic in Turkey. He was laid to rest two days later, at Karşıyaka Cemetery in Ankara.

References

External links
 Prime Ministry website 

1925 births
2020 deaths
20th-century prime ministers of Turkey
Nationalist Democracy Party politicians
Motherland Party (Turkey) politicians
Prime Ministers of Turkey
Deputy Prime Ministers of Turkey
Ministers of Foreign Affairs of Turkey
Government ministers of Turkey
Deputies of Ankara
Deputies of Mersin
Turkish judges
Ankara University alumni
Academic staff of Çankaya University
Recipients of the Legion of Honour
Ministers of Customs and Trade of Turkey
Members of the 45th government of Turkey
Members of the 46th government of Turkey
Members of the 47th government of Turkey
Members of the 44th government of Turkey
Ministers of State of Turkey
Deaths from the COVID-19 pandemic in Turkey
Burials at Karşıyaka Cemetery, Ankara